Universal Investment is a group of companies headquartered in Frankfurt am Main with three regulated investment companies based in Germany, Luxembourg and Ireland. Biggest part is Universal-Investment Gesellschaft mbH, founded in 1968. Core offerings are investment fund services and management company services for asset management companies and institutional investors. The company launches and administers funds for all asset classes such as securities, alternative investments and real estate.

According to its own information, the group manages more than 740 billion euros in about 1,900 funds with about 1,000 employees. The company is an affiliate member of Investment Association.

With Universal-Investment-Luxembourg S.A., Universal Investment is also active in Luxembourg, where it is one of the 20 largest management companies with assets under administration of 108 billion euros.

History 

In 1968, the company was founded by several German private banks as joint investment company

In 2012, Berenberg Bank and Bankhaus Lampe acquired the shares of Hauck & Aufhäuser and Landesbank Baden-Württemberg.

With closing date 11 January 2017, the current main shareholder of Universal-Investment is Montagu Private Equity LLP, who acquired the shares from the former parent companies. In 2019, Universal Investment acquired the IT service provider UI labs, which specializes in front-office solutions, from Lupus alpha. In 2020, the company founded UI Enlyte, a digital asset investment platform based on distributed ledger technology, and acquired CAPinside, an online investment community. In 2021 the group acquired Metzler Bank's Irish fund management company and renamed it Universal Investment Ireland Fund Management Limited. In 2022, the company announced the acquisition of Luxembourg fund administrator European Fund Administration S.A. Also in 2022, Canadian Pension Plan Investment Board acquired a minority stake in the company. The acquisition is subject of regulatory clearances.

Shareholder 
 Montagu Private Equity

References

External links 

 Official Website

Financial services companies established in 1968
Companies based in Frankfurt
Investment management companies of Germany
Private equity firms of Europe